Eleven Men and a Ball (Italian: 11 uomini e un pallone) is a 1948 Italian sports comedy film directed by Giorgio Simonelli and starring Carlo Dapporto, Carlo Campanini and Clelia Matania.

The film's sets were designed by the art director Saverio D'Eugenio.

Synopsis
To prevent a gifted player performing for his team in a decisive match, the opposing club go to greatlengths to try to avoid him making it to the game.

Cast
 Carlo Dapporto as Romeo
 Carlo Campanini as Achille
 Clelia Matania as Clelia
 Ernesto Almirante as Il professore 
 Adriana Serra as Cassiera bar
 Enrico Luzi as Un barista 
 Ferruccio Amendola
 Giorgio Baraghi
 Fiorella Betti
 Arturo Bragaglia
 Bruno Cantalamessa
 Andrea De Pino
 Maria Dominiani
 Georges Flamant
 Fedele Gentile
 Greta Gonda
 Fausto Guerzoni
 Felice Minotti
 Piero Pastore
 Giovanni Petrucci 
 Paolo Reale
 Agostino Salvietti
 Octave Senoret
 Bruno Smith

References

Bibliography 
 Chiti, Roberto & Poppi, Roberto. Dizionario del cinema italiano: Dal 1945 al 1959. Gremese Editore, 1991.

External links 
 

1948 films
Italian sports comedy films
1940s sports comedy films
Italian association football films
1940s Italian-language films
Films directed by Giorgio Simonelli
Italian black-and-white films
Films with screenplays by Mario Amendola
1940s Italian films